Sarón is the largest town in Santa María de Cayón, a municipality in Cantabria, Spain.

It was founded in 1876 in a road intersection by a landowner from nearby La Abadilla, whose name was Antonio Saro y Galbán. The name of the town comes from his first surname. In the town of La Penilla, 2 kilometres away, there is a Nestlé factory, which was the first one to open in Spain in 1905. One of the oldest buildings still standing in Sarón is the market, built in 1929.

As of 2020, its population was 3 220 people, of which 50.7 % are male and 49.3 % female.

Notable people 

 José Manuel Fernández García, music composer, born in 1956

References 

Populated places in Cantabria
1876 establishments in Spain